The Street of Tears is a 1924 American silent drama film directed by Travers Vale and starring Tom Santschi, Marguerite Clayton, and Gordon Griffith.

Cast
 Tom Santschi as Jim Carlson 
 Marguerite Clayton as Betty Blair 
 Gordon Griffith as Ted Weller 
 Barbara Tennant as Mary Weller 
 George MacQuarrie as Dan Weller 
 Mamie Ryan as Charlotte Morgan

Preservation
With no prints of The Street of Tears located in any film archives, it is a lost film.

References

Bibliography
 Munden, Kenneth White. The American Film Institute Catalog of Motion Pictures Produced in the United States, Part 1. University of California Press, 1997.

External links

1924 films
1924 drama films
Silent American drama films
Films directed by Travers Vale
American silent feature films
1920s English-language films
Rayart Pictures films
American black-and-white films
1920s American films